This is a list of media outlets in San Antonio, Texas.

Television stations
San Antonio is currently ranked as the 36th largest market by Nielsen. Despite the relatively large size of both the city proper and the metropolitan area, San Antonio has always been a medium-sized market. This is mainly because the nearby suburban and rural areas are not much larger than the city itself. By comparison, the other two Texas cities with populations of over a million people, Houston and Dallas, are among the 10 largest markets.

Below are a list of TV channels and their subchannels for the market:

Radio
San Antonio, Texas is the 25th largest radio market in the US as ranked by Nielsen Audio (formerly Arbitron). The following is a list of radio stations serving the San Antonio area.

AM Radio

FM Radio

See also
 Texas media
 List of newspapers in Texas
 List of radio stations in Texas
 List of television stations in Texas
 Media of cities in Texas: Abilene, Amarillo, Austin, Beaumont, Brownsville, Dallas, Denton, El Paso, Fort Worth, Houston, Killeen, Laredo, Lubbock, McAllen, McKinney, Midland, Odessa, Waco, Wichita Falls

San Antonio